Idiotrella is a genus of crickets in the subfamily Hapithinae and tribe Aphonomorphini.  Species have been recorded from:  Indo-China and West Malesia including Borneo.

Species
The Orthoptera Species File lists:
 Idiotrella coomani (Chopard, 1939) - Vietnam
 Idiotrella javae Gorochov, 2002 – type species
 Idiotrella karnyi (Chopard, 1929)
 Idiotrella malaccae Gorochov, 2002
 Idiotrella pachyonyx (Chopard, 1930)

References

External links
 

Ensifera genera
crickets
Orthoptera of Asia